Cleavage and polyadenylation specificity factor subunit 5 (CPSF5) is an enzyme that in humans is encoded by the NUDT21 gene. It belongs to the Nudix family of hydrolases.

The protein encoded by this gene is one subunit of the cleavage factor Im complex required for 3' RNA cleavage and polyadenylation processing. The interaction of the protein with the RNA is one of the earliest steps in the assembly of the 3' end processing complex and facilitates the recruitment of other processing factors. This gene encodes the 25kD subunit of the protein complex, which is composed of four polypeptides.

References

Further reading

Nudix hydrolases